John Edward Minnis (26 January 1922 – 6 February 1975) was an Australian rules footballer who played with Melbourne in the Victorian Football League (VFL).

Notes

External links 

1922 births
Australian rules footballers from Victoria (Australia)
Melbourne Football Club players
1975 deaths